An incidence structure  consists of points , lines , and flags  where a point  is said to be incident with a line  if . It is a (finite) partial geometry if there are integers  such that:

 Each line is incident with  points.
 Each point is incident with  lines.

Properties

Special case

Generalisations
A partial linear space  of order  is called a semipartial geometry if there are integers  such that:

 Every pair of non-collinear points have exactly  common neighbours.

A semipartial geometry is a partial geometry if and only if .

It can be easily shown that the collinearity graph of such a geometry is strongly regular with parameters 
.

See also
 Strongly regular graph
 Maximal arc

References
 
 
 
 
 

Incidence geometry